La Fueva (in Aragonese: A Fueba; and officially "La Fueva-A Fueba") is a municipality located in the province of Huesca, Aragon, western Spain. , the municipality has a population of 619 inhabitants.

The main settlement, and municipal seat, is the village of Tierrantona. The ruins of the Real Monasterio de San Victorián are located in La Fueva municipal term, at the feet of the Peña Montañesa.

Other notable features in the municipality include Cerro de Charo, a small hill.

References

External links 
 Official website 
  Muro de Roda in the Sobrarbe tourist portal

Municipalities in the Province of Huesca